Treis Volakous ("three rocks") are rocks close to the southern coast of Crete in the Libyan Sea. They fall within the administration of the municipality of Sfakia, in Chania regional unit.

See also
List of islands of Greece

Landforms of Chania (regional unit)
Uninhabited islands of Crete
Mediterranean islands
Islands of Greece